The 1946 Syracuse Orangemen football team represented Syracuse University in the 1946 college football season. The Orangemen were led by head coach Clarence "Biggie" Munn, in his first and only year with the team. Munn left to take the head coaching position at Michigan State, where he would later win several national titles. The Orangemen compiled a record of 4–5 under Munn.

During the season Miami Hurricanes cancelled a scheduled game against the Penn State team as Miami officials felt that Penn State fielding their two African American in Miami could have led to "unfortunate incidents". Miami reportedly invited Syracuse to replace Penn State. This invitation was promptly declined and rebuked in an editorial in The Daily Orange, titled "No Thanks, Miami".

Schedule

After the season

The 1947 NFL Draft was held on December 16, 1946. The following Orangeman was selected.

References

Syracuse
Syracuse Orange football seasons
Syracuse Orangemen football